Muniovita Kasiringua (born 1 September 1987) is a Namibian rugby union player, currently playing with the Namibia national team and the  in the South African Currie Cup competition. His regular position is lock.

Rugby career
Kasiringua was born in Otjiwarongo.

References

External links
 

Namibian rugby union players
Living people
1987 births
People from Otjiwarongo
Rugby union locks
Namibia international rugby union players